On January 21, 2017, the Hirakhand Express 18448, a scheduled passenger train from Jagdalpur to Bhubaneswar, derailed near the village of Kuneru in Vizianagaram, Andhra Pradesh, India, killing 41 people and injuring 68 others. The train was carrying 600 passengers.

Accident 
The diesel engine of the train and nine cars derailed on Saturday around 11 pm local time. Three cars derailed with enough force to leave the roadbed entirely, and some collided with a freight train on a parallel track. According to a district fire department official, some of the casualties were a result of a stampede within the train as passengers tried to flee after the crash. Emergency teams worked intensively to locate and rescue survivors from the crash, said the National railway spokesman Anil Saxena.

Aftermath 
The first rescue workers reached the location of the crash 40 minutes after the train derailed. Rescue and recovery work continued until the next day, while repairs to the track were completed by the morning of 23 January. Indian Railways said that it would pay ₹200,000 to the families of those killed in the crash and ₹50,000 to injured passengers, while the government of Odisha announced that it planned to pay ₹500,000 to families of the dead.

Investigation 
According to Andhra Pradesh Chief Minister N. Chandrababu Naidu, investigation of the accident, in conjunction with India's Railway Safety Commissioner, started on January 22. Director General of Police K.B. Singh said that there was no evidence of sabotage of the track involved, though unnamed railroad officials had initially hypothesized such.

See also 
 Pukhrayan train derailment
 List of deadliest rail accidents
 List of Indian rail incidents

References 

2017 disasters in India
History of Andhra Pradesh (2014–present)
2010s in Andhra Pradesh
January 2017 events in India
Railway accidents in 2017
Railway accidents and incidents in Andhra Pradesh
Vizianagaram district
Derailments in India